The 51st Golden Bell Awards (Mandarin:第51屆金鐘獎) was held on October 8, 2016 at Sun Yat-sen Memorial Hall in Taipei, Taiwan. The ceremony was broadcast live by Sanlih E-Television. Jacky Wu and comedian group Plungon hosted the ceremony.

Winners and nominees
Below is the list of winners and nominees for the main categories.

References

External links
 Official website of the 51st Golden Bell Awards 

2016
2016 television awards
2016 in Taiwan